Francois Habitegeko is the governor of the Western Province of Rwanda.

Career 
Habitegeko governed the country's Northern Province beginning in February 2011, but left that post after being appointed as Governor of Western Province on 15 March 2021. Habitegeko has credited himself for vastly increasing the quality of life in Northern Province, bringing the percentage of households with electricity from 0.8% in 2011 to 90% at the end of his career.

He supported Rwanda during the 2022 Democratic Republic of the Congo–Rwanda tensions. He supports the disarmament of the Democratic Forces for the Liberation of Rwanda, or FDLR.

References

External links 

 

Rwandan politicians
Living people
Year of birth missing (living people)
Western Province, Rwanda
Northern Province, Rwanda